Wallburg is a town in Davidson County, North Carolina, United States. It was incorporated in 2004. As of the 2020 census it had a population of 3,051.

Geography 
It is bordered to the north by Forsyth County. Other nearby municipalities include Kernersville to the northeast, Thomasville to the south, and Midway to the southwest. Wallburg is located in the Wallburg Elementary, Oak Grove Middle School, and Ledford Senior High school districts. In 2017, the Wallburg high school district will be changed to the Oak Grove High School district, which will be located across the street from Oak Grove Middle School.

History
The George W. Wall House was added to the National Register of Historic Places in 1984.

Climate

Demographics

2020 census

As of the 2020 United States census, there were 3,051 people, 1,211 households, and 935 families residing in the town.

References

External links
 Town of Wallburg official website
 Davidson County Attractions & Resources

Towns in Davidson County, North Carolina
Towns in North Carolina